John William Rogerson (1935–2018) was an English theologian, biblical scholar, and priest of the Church of England. He was professor of biblical studies at University of Sheffield.

Early life
He was born in 1935 in London and after serving in the Royal Air Force, where he worked in intelligence, he took a degree in theology at the University of Manchester. Among his teachers were H. H. Rowley, John M. Allegro, F. F. Bruce, S. G. F. Brandon, and Arnold Anderson. His ministerial training was at Ripon Hall, Oxford, followed by an honours degree in Oriental studies at Oxford, where he was taught by, among others, G. R. Driver. He also spent a term at the newly founded St. George's College, Jerusalem. After graduating from Oxford in 1963 he won a scholarship to the Hebrew University, where he studied under Chaim Rabin. In 1964 he moved to Durham as a lecturer and tutor at University College, where he was ordained. In 1971, researching in social anthropology, he made the first of many visits to Germany, which initiated his interest in especially 18th- and 19th-century German philosophy and biblical scholarship.

Academic career
In 1975 he was awarded a DD from the University of Manchester and in 1979 was appointed professor and head of department at the University of Sheffield, where he led a renowned group of scholars. Among his many activities he began a series of annual, and extremely popular, student study visits to the Holy Land. He retired in 1996 and remained an active scholar. A Festschrift in his honour, The Bible in Human Society, was published in 1995, on his retirement from the Sheffield Chair. He has been awarded honorary degrees from Universities of Aberdeen (1998) Jena (2005) and Freiburg (2006).

John Rogerson's interests ranged widely from linguistics and philosophy to German biblical scholarship, Palestinian topography, and social anthropology. As David J. A. Clines remarked, "There proved to be almost no area to which Old Testament studies could be related in which John Rogerson did not make himself a master".

He was for many years the secretary of the British Society for Old Testament Study and was its president in 1989. He was a keen musician and played the cello, and continued an active ministry at Beauchief Abbey, Sheffield, as well as academic and pastoral writing.

Rogerson died on 4 September 2018 whilst in hospital in Sheffield.

Selected writings

Books

Articles

Notes

References

Footnotes

Bibliography

 
 
 

1935 births
2018 deaths
20th-century Christian biblical scholars
20th-century Church of England clergy
20th-century English Anglican priests
21st-century Christian biblical scholars
21st-century Church of England clergy
21st-century English Anglican priests
Academics of Durham University
Academics of the University of Sheffield
Alumni of the University of Manchester
Anglican biblical scholars
Anglican socialists
Christian humanists
English biblical scholars
English Christian socialists
Old Testament scholars
People educated at Hutchesons' Grammar School
Anglican clergy from London
Presidents of the Society for Old Testament Study